Agent 505: Death Trap in Beirut/Agent 505 - Todesfalle Beirut/From Beirut with Love is a 1966 German/French/Italian international co-production Eurospy film shot in Lebanon.  It was produced and directed by Manfred R. Köhler. The film stars Frederick Stafford in his second film and Renate Ewert in her final feature film.

Plot
Interpol Agent 505 Richard Blake battles a  mysterious criminal known as "the Sheik" who plans to eliminate the population of Beirut by dropping radioactive mercury on the city.

Cast
Frederick Stafford	... 	Richard Blake, Agent 505
Geneviève Cluny	... Denise Letienne 
Chris Howland	... Bobby O'Toole
Harald Leipnitz 	... 	Fred Köhler
Willy Birgel 	... 	Omar Abdullah
Renate Ewert 	... 	Room Maid
Gisella Arden 	... 	Monique Köhler
Pierre Richard 	... 	Inspector Bernard
Renato Lupi 	... 	Anthony Leandros
Carla Calò 	... 	Boss 
Danny Taborra 	... 	Police Director 
Patrick Bernhard 	... 	Thug

Soundtrack
The film was scored by Ennio Morricone. The film's score is divided into three different music styles; the film's intro sequence is heavy on brass instruments, while the remainder of the film is scored using both swing music and a combination of a guitar cue and flutes.

Analysis
The film was cited by author Derrick Bang as an example of a genre of spy movies derived from James Bond.

References

External links

Agent 505: Death Trap in Beirut at Variety Distribution

1966 films
Italian spy thriller films
1960s spy thriller films
German spy thriller films
French spy thriller films
Spanish spy thriller films
West German films
1960s German-language films
Films about nuclear war and weapons
Films set in Lebanon
Films shot in Lebanon
1960s Italian films
1960s French films
1960s German films